Mildenhall Rural District was a rural district in the county of West Suffolk, England. It was created in 1894 out of the former Mildenhall rural sanitary district.

In 1935 it was expanded by taking in parts of the disbanded Brandon and Moulton RDs.

Since 1 April 1974 it has formed part of the local government district of Forest Heath and then from 1st April 2019 West Suffolk District.

Parishes

Statistics

References

Local government districts of the East of England
Rural districts of England
Forest Heath